The Chemical Database Service is an EPSRC-funded mid-range facility that provides UK academic institutions with access to a number of chemical databases. It has been hosted by the Royal Society of Chemistry since 2013, before which it was hosted by Daresbury Laboratory (part of the Science and Technology Facilities Council).

Currently, the included databases are:

ACD/I-Lab, a tool for prediction of physicochemical properties and NMR spectra from a chemical structure
Available Chemicals Directory, a structure-searchable database of commercially available chemicals
Cambridge Structural Database (CSD), a crystallographic database of organic and organometallic structures
Inorganic Crystal Structure Database (ICSD), a crystallographic database of inorganic structures
CrystalWorks, a database combining data from CSD, ICSD and CrystMet
DETHERM, a database of thermophysical data for chemical compounds and mixtures
SPRESIweb, a database of organic compounds and reactions

References 

Chemical databases
Engineering and Physical Sciences Research Council
Information technology organisations based in the United Kingdom
Royal Society of Chemistry
Science and technology in Cheshire